Alexander Stephan (born 15 September 1986 in Erlangen, West Germany), is a German former footballer who played for 1. FC Nuremberg II as a goalkeeper.

International career
He has represented the Germany U19 team on one occasion.

Honours
DFB-Pokal:
Winner: 2006–07

External links
 Alexander Stephan at the official FCN website
 
 

1986 births
Living people
Sportspeople from Erlangen
German footballers
1. FC Nürnberg players
1. FC Nürnberg II players
Bundesliga players
Association football goalkeepers
Footballers from Bavaria